Paralaoma goweri, also known as the mountain pinhead snail, is a species of land snail that is endemic to Australia's Lord Howe Island in the Tasman Sea.

Description
The depressedly turbinate shell of the mature snail is 1.3 mm in height, with a diameter of 1.9 mm, and a raised spire. It is deep golden-brown in colour. The whorls are rounded and tightly coiled, with impressed sutures and moderately spaced radial ribs. It has a roundedly lunate aperture and moderately widely open umbilicus.

Distribution and habitat
This snail is very rare and only found on the summit of Mount Gower.

References

 
 

 
goweri
Gastropods of Lord Howe Island
Taxa named by Tom Iredale
Gastropods described in 1944